Renzo Mariano Malanca (born 6 May 2003) is an Argentine professional footballer who plays as a centre-back for Huachipato.

Career
Malanca switched Club Leonardo Murialdo for Independiente Rivadavia in 2015. He signed his first professional contract at the age of sixteen on 9 October 2019, becoming the youngest ever player to do so for the club. In the succeeding February, Malanca appeared on the first-team's subs bench for a Primera B Nacional fixture away to Ferro Carril Oeste; though wasn't substituted on by manager Matías Minich. The latter was replaced by Marcelo Straccia midway through the year, with the new coach selecting Malanca to start for his senior debut, aged seventeen, on 3 January 2021 against Alvarado.

Personal life
In October 2020, Malanca and two other teammates showed possible symptoms of COVID-19 amid the pandemic. They were separated from the main squad, with a player testing positive soon after; though their identity wasn't revealed by Independiente Rivadavia.

Career statistics
.

References

External links

2003 births
Living people
Argentine footballers
Argentine expatriate footballers
Association football defenders
Independiente Rivadavia footballers
C.D. Huachipato footballers
Primera Nacional players
Chilean Primera División players
Expatriate footballers in Chile
Argentine expatriate sportspeople in Chile
Sportspeople from Mendoza Province